Ionikos Lamias B.C. was a Greek professional basketball club based in Lamia, Greece. In 2014, the club merged with Esperos Lamia.

History
In 2006, Ionikos Lamias was promoted to the Greek A2 League. In the 2005–06 season, Ionikos managed to make it to the final 8 round of the Greek Cup, before being eliminated from the cup tournament by AEK Athens.

The club merged with Esperos Lamia in 2014, in order to form a new club.

Notable players
 Kostas Kakaroudis

Notable coaches
 Branislav Prelević

External links
Official Website
Eurobasket.com Team Page

Defunct basketball teams in Greece
Basketball teams established in 1992
Basketball teams disestablished in 2014